Nashwan (1986–2002) was a Thoroughbred racehorse.

'Nashwan may also refer to:

 Nashwan Al-Harazi, Yemeni gymnast
 Nashwan al-Himyari, Yemeni theologian
 Nashwan Abdulrazaq Abdulbaqi, Iraqi Al-Qaeda member known by the nom de guerre Abdul Hadi al Iraqi

 See also 
 Nashwa (disambiguation), for the feminine version of Nashwan''

Arabic given names